Square Roots is a music festival in the United States.

Square Roots may also refer to:
 Square Roots: The Story of SpongeBob SquarePants, an animated film
 Square Roots (company), a vertical farming company cofounded by Kimbal Musk

See also
 Square root, a mathematical operation